Churu Junction railway station is a major railway station in Churu district, Rajasthan. Its code is CUR. It serves Churu city.

Infrastructure 
The station consists of four platforms.

Line 
Churu lies on the Delhi–Rewari–Bikaner broad gauge railway line and is also connected to Jaipur via Sikar and Reengus. 
Electrification of the Rewari–Churu–Bikaner and Churu-Jaipur track is going on. Electrification of Ratangarh–Rewari and Sikar-Jaipur section of these route has been completed, simultaneously.

References

External links

Railway junction stations in Rajasthan
Railway stations in Churu district
Bikaner railway division